Quesito may refer to:

Quesito a Puerto Rican cheese pastry
The word quesitos is Spanish for pieces or bits of cheese